In Greek mythology, the Phonoi (singular: Phonos) were the "ghastly-faced" male personifications of murder.

Family 
Hesiod in the Theogony named the Phonoi's mother as Eris ("Discord"), and their siblings as: the Hysminai (Battles), the Makhai (Wars), the Androktasiai (Manslaughters) and other malevolent daemons.

 "And hateful Eris bore painful Ponos ("Hardship"),
 Lethe ("Forgetfulness") and Limos ("Starvation") and the tearful Algea ("Pains"),
 Hysminai ("Battles"), Makhai ("Wars"), Phonoi ("Murders"), and Androktasiai ("Manslaughters");
 Neikea ("Quarrels"), Pseudea ("Lies"), Logoi ("Stories"), Amphillogiai ("Disputes")
 Dysnomia ("Anarchy") and Ate ("Ruin"), near one another,
 and Horkos ("Oath"), who most afflicts men on earth,
 Then willing swears a false oath."

Mythology 
In the epic poem the Shield of Heracles, attributed to Hesiod, Phonos (singular) was one of the many figures, depicted on Heracles' shield.

Aeschylus' accounts 
". . . hear me, you gods, that feel with us! By a fresh award redeem the blood of deeds done long ago. May aged Murder (phonos) cease begetting offspring in our house!""Amphiaraus repeatedly rebukes mighty Tydeus [in the war of the Seven Against Thebes] with evil names 'Murderer, maker of unrest in the city, principal teacher of evils to the Argives, summoner of Erinys (Vengeance's Curse), servant of Phonos (Slaughter).'"

Quintus' account 
The Phonoi are also represented in myths to be present during battles and fights along with other war deities."Then met the fronts of battle: dread it rang on either hand. Hard-strained was then the fight: incarnate Kydoimos (Strife) stalked through the midst, with Phonos (Slaughter) ghastly-faced . . . Through the air upshrieked an awful indistinguishable roar; for on both hosts fell iron-hearted Eris (Strife)."

Notes

References
 Aeschylus, translated in two volumes. 1. Seven Against Thebes by Herbert Weir Smyth, Ph. D. Cambridge, MA. Harvard University Press. 1926. Online version at the Perseus Digital Library. Greek text available from the same website.
Aeschylus, translated in two volumes. 2. Libation Bearers by Herbert Weir Smyth, Ph. D. Cambridge, MA. Harvard University Press. 1926. Online version at the Perseus Digital Library. Greek text available from the same website.
Caldwell, Richard, Hesiod's Theogony, Focus Publishing/R. Pullins Company (June 1, 1987). .
 Hesiod, Theogony, in The Homeric Hymns and Homerica with an English Translation by Hugh G. Evelyn-White, Cambridge, Massachusetts., Harvard University Press; London, William Heinemann Ltd. 1914. Online version at the Perseus Digital Library.
 Most, G.W., Hesiod: The Shield, Catalogue of Women, Other Fragments, Loeb Classical Library, No. 503, Cambridge, Massachusetts, Harvard University Press, 2007, 2018. . Online version at Harvard University Press.

Greek war deities
War gods
Greek gods
Personifications in Greek mythology
Children of Eris (mythology)
Murder